The decade of the 1900s in film involved some significant films.

Events
Several full-length films were produced during the 1900s (decade).

Lists of films

See also
 Film
 History of film 
 Lists of films

 
Films by decade
Film by decade
1900s decade overviews